Thomas William Edmondson, Ph. D., (1869– 5 November 1938) was an Anglo-American mathematician, born at Skipton-in-Craven, Yorkshire, England. He graduated from the University of London, studied at Cambridge, and also at Clark University, Worcester, Mass.  He was an associate professor at NYU from 1896 to 1905, and a professor of mathematics afterwards.  He wrote mathematical textbooks; his publications include:  
 Worked Examples in Coördinate Geometry (1891)  
 Mensuration and Spherical Geometry (1893), with W. Briggs  
 Deductions in Euclid (1901)

He married the former Minnie Ramsden in 1897 in Perth, Ontario.

References
.

1869 births
1938 deaths
19th-century American mathematicians
20th-century American mathematicians
American textbook writers
American male non-fiction writers
Clark University alumni
People from Skipton
19th-century American male writers